The Penrith Australian Football Club is an Australian rules football club based in the western Sydney suburb of Penrith, which plays its home games at Greygums Oval, Cranebrook. It competes in the Sydney AFL competition, running in season 2020 Senior and Reserve grade open-age grade sides (in Platinum Division and Platinum Division Reserves respectively), as well as a women's AFL team competing in Division 1.

History
The Penrith club was formed in 1981 from an idea principally from Keith Claxton, a prominent footballer then residing in the Penrith area. In its first two years the Rams fielded a Reserve Grade side in the Sydney District Football Association, playing before Hawkesbury's First Grade matches and using that club's home grounds at firstly Deerubbun Park, Windsor and then Colbee Park, McGrath's Hill. In their first season, the Rams bowed out in the Preliminary Final, but had individual honour winners in Keith Claxton (McFarlane Medal) and Peter Traeger (SDFA Reserve Grade Leading Goalkicker) – Peter had also kicked the Reserve Grade record of 11 goals in a game during the season, which stood for 26 years until broken by Jason Ware in 2006.

Next season, 1982, the club went one better, making the Grand Final, only to lose in a spiteful match to Sydney Uni. Again Keith Claxton won the McFarlane Medal and this time Tom Hall won the SDFA Reserve Grade goalkicking with 126 goals, the only time that a Rams player has kicked 100 goals in a season. 1982 also saw the first Rams age-based senior side fielded, the Under 20's, which made the First Semi-Final.

In 1983, Penrith expanded to fielding First and Reserve Grade sides and also moved to its own home ground at Sales Park, Luddenham. The years 1983 to 1985 were lean ones for the club, fielding two quality sides proving difficult, although First Grade managed an improved 9th position in 1985.

Things lifted in 1986, with the First Grade side finishing a very respectable sixth. In that year the Rams also kicked their record club score, 62.22 (394), against Camden at Sales Park.

In 1987, Penrith again moved grounds, this time to Greygums Oval, Mt Pleasant. The SDFA was renamed the Sydney Football League (SFL) and split into two divisions, with Penrith playing in the second division. This revitalised the club's fortunes, with First Grade making the Grand Final – only to lose to the strong Liverpool side. Graeme Tuckwell came second in the SFL Div 2 Reserve Grade Best and Fairest voting, while Stephen Cox established the club goalkicking record for an individual game, booting 20 goals against Blacktown. In 1988, the Rams also made the Grand Final only to again lose to Liverpool.

The years 1989 to 1991, in which there was no Reserve Grade competition, were the most productive years in the club's history. Going into the 1989 Grand Final against Auburn at Wagener Oval as rank underdogs, the Rams easily won their first premiership by 51 points. To cap off a great year, club stalwart Geoff Eldering won the Apted Medal for Best and Fairest Player in the competition. The Under 20's side in 1989 (the Nepean Colts – a composite of Penrith and Blacktown players) also featured the competition's leading goalkicker in Phil Lane.

In 1990, First Grade made the Preliminary Final, however inaccurate kicking cost the side a game they should have won . The Under 20's side, this time composed solely of Penrith players, made the First Semi-Final, only to go down to HMAS Nirimba. On 6 August, the first club reunion was held at the Kingswood Bowling Club.

The following year, 1991, was the most dominant in the club's history, with the First Grade side going through the season undefeated. In the newly renamed Sydney Football Association (Penrith were still in Division 2), the nearest thing to a loss was a draw against Bankstown. In the finals, the side kicked 25.12 (162) in the Second Semi-Final (the club's finals record score) and 22.17 (149) in the Grand Final, both times against Hawkesbury. Gavin Chalker kicked eight and nine goals respectively in these two games. The Under 20's did not participate this year and an age-based senior side did not resurface until 1996.

Season 1992 saw the reintroduction of the Reserve Grade competition, with both Penrith sides making and losing the Grand Final (against Bankstown in First Grade and Hawkesbury in Reserve Grade). In Reserve Grade, David Robinson took out the SFA Div 2 goalkicking award and Graeme Tuckwell was joint winner of the Armstrong Medal.

In 1993, a convincing Second Semi-Final win saw First Grade soar into the Grand Final  – only to lose to Hawkesbury. Reserve Grade bowed out in the Preliminary Final.

Sydney football was again restructured in 1994. The second division of the Sydney Football Association was abolished, and Penrith were promoted to the higher division. The Rams' First Grade side made fifth spot, and played off in the Elimination Final against Wollongong. After trailing all day, the Rams got up to draw the match, only to lose by a single point in extra time. Captain-coach David Armstrong equalled the club finals goalkicking record by booting nine goals in this game, and capped off a great year by also winning the SFA's Snow Medal. Early in the season the
First Grade side kicked the club's second highest score, 50.33 (333), against Blacktown at Greygums Oval.

1995 was a lean year for the club, then 1996 saw the reintroduction of an Age Grade side – the Under 18's, which finished a creditable fifth. The First and Reserve Grade sides that year performed moderately on the field, but were able to lift from the results of 1995.

In 1997 the Under 18's did not field a side and the senior sides struggled despite their best efforts.

In 1998 the Under 18's were reintroduced and finished sixth, one place out of the finals. Glenn Bradley booted 70 goals to finish second in the SFL Under 18 goalkicking (as well as being joint runner-up in the Kealey Medal, a sole vote behind the winners), highlights including individual hauls of 12 and 11 goals. The senior sides showed promising results, probably the highlight being the club's first-ever win over Wollongong in both grades at Greygums Oval.

Season 1999 saw a great improvement in the club's on field performances. Both First and Reserve grades were in finals contention until the latter stages of the season, ultimately missing out on the playoffs. The Under 18 competition was split into two divisions, with Penrith playing in the second division and making it through to the First Semi-Final. Mark Egan(Crab) showed a glimpse of things to come by finishing runner-up in the Hart Medal in that competition.

The following year, 2000, saw First Grade go one better, finishing fifth and making the finals for the first time since 1994 – although they were again to lose the Elimination Final to Wollongong. The side also recorded their first win, after many attempts, against Manly-Warringah – a thumping 77 point win at Weldon Oval. Reserve Grade, however, slipped dramatically in a disappointing year. Despite struggling for numbers at times, the Under 18's made it to the Preliminary Final and were unlucky to lose that game. David Bradley won the Hart Medal as the outstanding player of the season in that division.

Season 2001 saw the club win its third premiership, the Under 18's going through the season unbeaten (the second instance by a Penrith side). The side kicked a record 31.20 (206) against the Western Jets on 7 July. Both First and Reserve Grades were a stone's throw away from the finals, the twos in particular unluckily missing out at the death. A very successful 21st birthday celebration was held on 21 July at Emu Sports Club, at which the club's honour board was officially unveiled. Michael Ross and Greg Masters won the Hart and McFarlane Medals respectively, with Michael also winning the Under 18 Div 2 goalkicking award. Michael's goal tally included a grade record of 15 goals, in the previously mentioned record score.

With the loss of many senior players in 2002 due to injury, relocation and other reasons, both senior sides struggled and could only win three games between them. A highlight for First Grade, however, was their first ever win over Holroyd-Parramatta in Round 2. The Under 18's provided the major success, winning their second consecutive flag and Penrith's fourth. Michael Ross again excelled individually, taking the Hart Medal and League Goalkicking awards for the second successive year.

Season 2003 saw the Rams move home grounds to Dukes Oval, Emu Plains, after 16 seasons at Greygums Oval. The club formed partnerships with St Clair (SFA Div 2) – fielding the Penrith-St Clair Crows – and the Nor-West Jets (SAFL Under 18's) – fielding the Greater West Under 18's. Administration wise, Penrith moved to a Board structure for the first time. Despite often being competitive, First Grade did not manage a win, whilst Reserve Grade won two matches, including a magnificent Round 17 win against then second-placed Macquarie University. Penrith-St Clair lost their final home and away match of the season by three points, relegating them to fourth place on the ladder – a win would have gained them second spot. With a number of players injured and unavailable for the First Semi-Final, the Crows went down to a stronger UTS side. Nathan Baird finished runner-up in the SFA Division 2 Armstrong Medal count. The Greater West Under 18's had a solid season, finishing 8th.

In 2004, the Rams continued the partnership with St Clair in Second Division, but the Under 18's venture did not continue and a side was not fielded. First Grade managed an historic win in Round 5 vs Manly-Warringah at Dukes Oval, their first since 2002. Otherwise, the season was winless for the side, but it proved to be a far more competitive outfit than in recent times. Reserve Grade looked like going through the season winless but, for the second season in a row, defeated Macquarie Uni at home late in the year. Penrith-St Clair finished third at the end of the home and away season however again lost the First Semi-Final to UTS. At the Phelan Medal night, the Crows' Daniel Molkentin won the Armstrong Medal, as the Sydney AFL Second Division's Best & Fairest player. The club's end of season Presentation Night was the best attended for many years, with 125 people there.

Season 2005 saw three sides drop out of the First Division competition, leaving eight remaining clubs. St Clair decided to discontinue the partnership with Penrith, the Rams fielding Senior and Reserve Grade sides in First Division as a result (the first time since 1997 the club has fielded only the two sides). Senior Grade had a very successful season, finishing fourth and contesting the finals for the first time since 2000. Unfortunately, the side could not progress past the First Semi-Final. Reserve Grade finished fifth, after a particularly successful opening half of the season. Matthew Brennan and Cal Curry finished third and fourth respectively in the Snow Medal count, whilst Craig Saad finished fifth in the McFarlane Medal. Season 2005 also saw the formation of the Greater Western Power, with an Under 18 side being fielded in the Sydney AFL Premier Division competition.

Season 2006 started with the club leaving Dukes Oval, its home of three seasons, to return to Greygums Oval. Also prior to the season's start, the committee of the Greater Western Power voted to come under the umbrella of the Penrith club, meaning the Rams fielded an Under 18 side in its own name for the first time since 2002. Jason Ware booted 14 goals in the Round 4 Reserve Grade game against Holroyd-Parramatta, breaking the record for that grade which had stood since 1981. Senior and Reserve Grades missed out on the finals (each finishing sixth), while the Under 18s had a promising season interrupted by rain, which eventually saw them occupy fifth spot. A major highlight of 2006 was the 25th Anniversary Dinner, held at Emu Plains Sporting and Recreation Club on Saturday, 29 July, with approximately 100 people in attendance.

In 2007, the First Division competition went through a further restructure, being reduced to seven teams as a result. The Rams again fielded Senior and Reserve grade sides. After initially hoping to field its own Under 18s side, the club eventually partnered again with the Nor-West Jets to field a joint side, simply titled Penrith/Nor-West. After experiencing the biggest player drain in the club's history, both senior sides struggled, winning just one game each – however, the Under 18s won five games to finish sixth. Dale Chivas polled well in the Snow Medal, finishing in third place with 14 votes – only two behind the winner.

In 2008 the Rams formalised their standalone Under 18's team as well as a First and Reserve grade teams. Although performing well after a great start, a mid-season slump saw the 18's miss the finals. In their last game of the season, however, they defeated Grand Finalists Southern Power at Greygums Oval.

2009 Saw the divisionalisation of Sydney Football with Penrith dropping a division. The senior sides struggled with player numbers and despite some good wins, did not feature in the finals series. However, the Under 18's had a great season and went down narrowly to Southern Power in the Preliminary Final which dashed their aims of a Grand Final berth. Matthew Payne and Harley Stibbard shared the "Best and Fairest" award in the 18's whilst John Keane took the First Grade Award and veteran Jason Ware the Reserve Grade honours. Both Payne and Ware were runners-up in the Sydney AFL Best and Fairest adjudged by the umpires.

In November 2009, a new board was elected with Kevin Tate taking over as chairman. The board of five immediately appointed a seven-person "Advisory Committee" with a wealth of experience, especially with junior football who are committed to youth development in the region and to see success and glory return to the Penrith and Blue Mountains region. In December, a major coup for the Rams was obtained with the partnership and sponsorship agreement between the Rams and Australia's leading grocery products, IGA Signature.

The benefits of the new divisionalization structure and a refreshed administration showed immediate results in season 2010. Senior Grade came from 3rd on the ladder to make the Grand Final, only to lose to Moorebank Sports. Reserve Grade managed a very creditable sixth on the ladder, only missing the finals by one game and percentage. Under 18s provided the success story of the season, going through the Challenge Cup season unbeaten and defeating Holroyd-Parramatta in the Grand Final, thus winning the club's third Under 18s premiership. The club then went on to scoop the pool at the Phelan Medal Awards, with Rams players winning in each grade – Lachlan Smith (McFarlane Medal for Division 3), Jason Ware (Armstrong Medal for Division 4) and Matt Payne (Hart Medal for Under 18s Challenge Cup). Ben McGovern also won the Under 18s Challenge Cup goalkicking award.

The momentum from the previous season continued into 2011. Both Senior and Reserve Grades finished Minor Premiers at the end of the home & away season, both sides going through to the Grand Final. Reserve Grade weren't able to secure a premiership, going down to Moorebank Sports, however Senior Grade won the club's first senior flag in 20 years, defeating Balmain by 35 points. The Under 18s were promoted to the top level Premier Cup competition and performed creditably, without luck on occasions. The Phelan Medal night again brought success, with Rams players Dale Chivas and David Bradley sharing the Sanders Medal and Jason Bradley winning the Division 4 goalkicking award.

2012 saw the Rams field five sides for the first time in its history – 3 senior sides, Under 18s and a ladies side (the Ramettes). First grade played in Division One, the highest grade in which a Penrith side has ever competed, and finished a creditable fifth, making the first week of the finals. Reserve Grade had a stellar season, winning the first ever flag in that grade for the club, defeating Gosford in the Grand Final. Whilst not winning a game, the Ramettes did manage a draw in one game and had an extremely satisfying season. Individually, Ramettes Natalie Camilleri made the Sydney AFL Women's team of the year and Stephanie Kostic won the Sydney AFL Women's Rising Star award.

The Rams maintained five sides for season 2013. The most successful of these was the Ramettes, now in the newly created Women's Division 2 competition, who won their First Semi-Final in extra time and bowed out of contention in the Preliminary Final. The best of the other sides was Senior Grade, finishing in sixth position, whilst Reserve and Third Grade both had competitive seasons. The Under 18s found life far more competitive in the Division 2 competition.

2018 saw all 5 Penrith sides finish the regular season in positions to challenge for their respective premierships. Men's reserve grade finished third, being knocked out in the semi-finals. First Grade finished one position higher in second spot, however won the Platinum Division premiership, defeating the Western Magic by 17 points. The Under 19s team ended the regular season in second, but did not make it past the semi-final. Women's Premier Division finished third, going down to the eventual premiers by 6 points in the preliminary final. The women's Division 2 side meanwhile made a late season charge to finals, finishing fifth and being eliminated in the Semi Final stage. Individual accolades where bountiful in 2018 with Auburn-Penrith Giants Renee Tomkins (also selected as full-back in the Premier Division team) and Haneen Zreika (also finished equal first in the Mostyn Medal as Best and Fairest in Premier Division but was ineligible due to suspension) being drafted by the Greater Western Sydney Giants AFL Women's side. Rams players also won the leading goal-kicker awards in both Platinum Division and Platinum Division Reserves.

2020 was a successful year for the Rams, winning the Platinum Division premiership for the second time in three years, and Matt Laffan being named Penrith's sexiest man by the Penrith Press for the fourth year running.

Club colours
From its formation until 2005, the club wore the colours of the Geelong Football Club, comprising guernseys with blue and white horizontal hoops. (In 2001 an updated style of the guernsey adding a "PFC" monogram on the front was adopted).
In 2006, the Rams changed their club colours and guernsey design to black, with teal, white and red trimmings. A modified version of this guernsey was adopted in 2009.
In 2010, the club moved to its current guernsey design, which is now principally teal and white.

Home Grounds
1981 – 1982:  Penrith did not have its own home ground. It shared the home ground of the Hawkesbury AFC (firstly Deerubbun Park, Windsor and then Colbee Park, McGraths Hill).
1983 – 1986:  Sales Park, Luddenham
1987 – 2002:  Greygums Oval, Cranebrook
2003 – 2005:  Dukes Oval, Emu Plains
2006 – Present:  Greygums Oval, Cranebrook

Premierships
SENIOR GRADE (5)
1989 – Sydney AFL Second Division Senior Grade
Grand Final: Penrith 14.5 (89) d Auburn 5.8 (38)
1991 – Sydney AFL Second Division Senior Grade
Grand Final: Penrith 22.17 (149) d Hawkesbury 10.11 (71)
2011 – Sydney AFL Division 2
Grand Final: Penrith 12.7 (79) d Balmain 6.8 (44)
'2018 – Sydney AFL Platinum Division 
Grand Final: Penrith 8.10 (58) d Western Magic 6.5 (41)2020 – Sydney AFL Platinum Division 
Grand Final: Penrith 14.7 (91) d Southern Power 5.7 (37)RESERVE GRADE (1)2012 – Sydney AFL Division 4
Grand Final: Penrith 9.16 (70) d Gosford 8.6 (54)UNDER 18 GRADE (3)2001 – Sydney AFL Second Division Under 18 Grade
Grand Final: Penrith 12.17 (89) d Manly-Warringah 4.3 (27)2002 – Sydney AFL Second Division Under 18 Grade
Grand Final: Penrith 6.9 (45) d Wollongong 3.9 (27)2010' – Sydney AFL Under 18 Grade Challenge CupGrand Final:'' Penrith 17.17 (119) d Holroyd-Parramatta 6.2 (38)

VFL/AFL players

References

External links
 
 Full Points Footy Profile for the Penrith AFC

Australian rules football clubs in Sydney
1981 establishments in Australia
Australian rules football clubs established in 1981
Penrith, New South Wales